Tennis elbow, also known as lateral epicondylitis or enthesopathy of the extensor carpi radialis origin, is an enthesopathy (attachment point disease) of the origin of the extensor carpi radialis brevis on the lateral epicondyle. The outer part of the elbow becomes painful and tender. The pain may also extend into the back of the forearm. Onset of symptoms is generally gradual although they can seem sudden and be misinterpreted as an injury. Golfer's elbow is a similar condition that affects the inside of the elbow.

Enthesopathies are idiopathic, meaning science has not yet determined the cause. Enthesopathies are most common in middle age (ages 35 to 60).

It is often stated that the condition is caused by excessive use of the muscles of the back of the forearm, but this is not supported by experimental evidence and is a common misinterpretation or unhelpful thought about symptoms. It may be associated with work or sports, classically racquet sports, but most people with the condition are not exposed to these activities. The diagnosis is based on the symptoms and examination. Medical imaging is not particularly useful. Signs consistent with the diagnosis include pain when a subject tries to bend back the wrist when the wrist is against resistance.

The natural history of untreated enthesopathy is resolution over a period of 1-2 years. Palliative (symptoms alleviating) treatment may include pain medications such as NSAIDS or acetaminophen (paracetamol), a wrist brace or strap over the upper forearm. The role of corticosteroid injections is debated. Recent evidence suggests corticosteroid injections may delay symptom resolution.

Signs and symptoms
 Pain on the outer part of the elbow (lateral epicondyle)
 Point tenderness over the lateral epicondyle—a prominent part of the bone on the outside of the elbow
 Pain with resisted wrist extension or passive wrist flexion

Symptoms associated with tennis elbow include, but are not limited to, pain from the outside of the elbow to the forearm and wrist and pain during extension of wrist.

Terminology
The term "tennis elbow" is widely used (although informal), but the condition should be understood as not limited to tennis players.  Historically, the medical term "lateral epicondylitis" was most commonly used for the condition, but "itis" implies inflammation and the condition is not inflammatory.

Since histological findings reveal noninflammatory tissue, the terms “lateral elbow tendinopathy" and "tendinosis” are suggested. In 2019, a group of international experts suggested that "lateral elbow tendinopathy" was the most appropriate terminology. But a disease of an attachment point (or enthesia) is most accurately referred to as an "enthesopathy."

Causes

Enthesopathy of the extensor carpi radialis brevis origin is idiopathic, meaning that it has no known cause.

Traditionally, people have speculated that tennis elbow is a type of repetitive strain injury resulting from tendon overuse and failed healing of the tendon, but there is no evidence of injury or repair on histopathology, and misinterpretation of painful activities as a source of damage is common.

Other speculative risk factors for lateral epicondylitis include taking up tennis later in life, unaccustomed strenuous activity, decreased mental chronometry and speed and repetitive eccentric contraction of muscle (controlled lengthening of a muscle group).

Pathophysiology
Histological findings are of mucoid degeneration: disorganized collagen, increased extracellular matrix, and chondroid metaplasia. There is no evidence of inflammation or repair. Therefore, the disorder is more appropriately referred to as tendinosis or tendinopathy—more accurately an enthesopathy—rather than tendinitis.

Diagnosis

Physical examination
Diagnosis is based on symptoms and clinical signs that are discrete and characteristic. For example, extension of the elbow and flexion of the wrist cause outer elbow pain. There is point tenderness at the origin of the extensor carpi radialis brevis muscle from the lateral epicondyle (extensor carpi radialis brevis origin).  There is also pain with resisted wrist extension (Cozen's test).

Medical imaging
Medical imaging is not necessary or helpful.

Radiographs (X-rays) may demonstrate calcification where the extensor muscles attach to the lateral epicondyle. Medical ultrasonography and magnetic resonance imaging (MRI) can demonstrate the pathology, but are not helpful for diagnosis and do not influence treatment.

Longitudinal sonogram of the lateral elbow displays thickening and heterogeneity of the common extensor tendon that is consistent with tendinosis, as the ultrasound reveals calcifications, intrasubstance tears, and marked irregularity of the lateral epicondyle. Although the term “epicondylitis” is frequently used to describe this disorder, most histopathologic findings of studies have displayed no evidence of an acute, or a chronic inflammatory process. Histologic studies have demonstrated that this condition is the result of tendon degeneration, which replaces normal tissue with a disorganized arrangement of collagen. Colour Doppler ultrasound reveals structural tendon changes, with vascularity and hypo-echoic areas that correspond to the areas of pain in the extensor origin.

Treatment
The natural history of untreated enthesopathy is resolution over a period of 1-2 years. Palliative (symptoms alleviating) treatment may include pain medications such as NSAIDS or acetaminophen (paracetamol), a wrist brace or strap over the upper forearm.

Exercises
Stretching and isometric strengthening are the most common recommended exercises. The muscle is stretched with the elbow straight and the wrist passively flexed. Isometric strengthening can be done by pushing the top of the hand up against the undersurface of a table and holding the wrist straight.

Orthotic devices

Orthosis is a device externally used on the limb to improve the function or reduce the pain. Orthotics may be useful in tennis elbow, however long-term effects are unknown. There are two main types of orthoses prescribed for this problem: counterforce elbow orthoses and wrist extension orthoses.  Counterforce orthosis has a circumferential structure surrounding the arm. This orthosis usually has a strap which applies a binding force over the origin of the wrist extensors. The applied force by orthosis reduces the elongation within the musculotendinous fibers. Wrist extensor orthosis maintains the wrist in the slight extension.

Speculative treatments 
Other approaches that are not experimentally tested include eccentric exercise using a rubber bar, joint manipulation directed at the elbow and wrist, spinal manipulation directed at the cervical and thoracic spinal regions, low level laser therapy, and extracorporeal shockwave therapy.

Medication
Although anti-inflammatories are a commonly prescribed treatment for tennis elbow, the evidence for their effect is usually anecdotal with only limited studies showing a benefit. A systematic review found that topical non-steroidal anti-inflammatory drugs (NSAIDs) may improve pain in the short term (up to 4 weeks) but was unable to draw firm conclusions due to methodological issues. Evidence for oral NSAIDs is mixed.

Evidence is poor for long term improvement from injections of any type, whether corticosteroids, botulinum toxin, prolotherapy or other substances. Corticosteroid injection may be effective in the short term however are of little benefit after a year, compared to a wait-and-see approach. A randomized control trial comparing the effect of corticosteroid injection, physiotherapy, or a combination of corticosteroid injection and physiotherapy found that patients treated with corticosteroid injection versus placebo had lower complete recovery or improvement at 1 year (Relative risk 0.86). Patients that received corticosteroid injection also had a higher recurrence rate at 1 year versus placebo (54% versus 12%, relative risk 0.23).
Complications from repeated steroid injections include skin problems such as hypopigmentation and fat atrophy leading to indentation of the skin around the injection site. Steroid injections against appear to be more effective than shock wave therapy. Botulinum toxin type A to paralyze the forearm extensor muscles in those with chronic tennis elbow that has not improved with conservative measures may be viable.

Surgery
Surgery is an option. Surgical methods include:
 Lengthening, release, debridement, or repair of the origin of the extrinsic extensor muscles of the hand at the lateral epicondyle

Surgical techniques for lateral epicondylitis can be done by open surgery, percutaneous surgery or arthroscopic surgery, with no high-quality evidence that any particular type is better or worse than another. Side effects include infection, damage to nerves and inability to straighten the arm.  A review of the evidence related to surgery found that published studies were of low quality and did not show that surgery was any more effective than other treatments.  A subsequent research trial showed that surgery was no more effective than sham surgery, where patients only received a skin incision, although the trial was limited by a small number of patients.

Epidemiology

Enthesopathy of the ECRB origin 

Evidence from imaging studies suggests that about 1 in 5 humans have detectable enthesopathy of the extensor carpi radialis brevis origin in their lifetime. Symptoms likely vary and are self-limited. The signal changes on MRI seem permanent. There is no evidence that specific occupations or activities are associated with enthesopathy.

Symptoms of lateral epicondylitis 

Symptoms suggestive of lateral epicondylitis are present in about 1% of the adult population, and is most common between ages 40 and 60. The prevalence varies somewhat between studies, likely as a result of varied diagnostic criteria and limited reliability between different observers. The data regarding symptoms of lateral epicondylitis in relation to occupations and sports are inconsistent and inconclusive. The shortcomings of the evidence that addresses the relationship between symptoms and occupation/sport include: variation in diagnostic criteria, limited reliability of diagnosis, confounding association of psychosocial factors, selection bias due to a high non-response rate, and the fact that exposures are usually by subjective patient report and symptomatic patient might perceive greater exposure.

History

German physician F. Runge is usually credited for the first description of the condition, calling it "writer's cramp" (Schreibekrampf) in 1873.  Later, it was called "washer women's elbow". British surgeon Henry Morris published an article in The Lancet describing "lawn tennis arm" in 1883. The popular term "tennis elbow" first appeared the same year in a paper by H. P. Major, described as "lawn-tennis elbow".

See also 

 Olecranon bursitis
 Radial tunnel syndrome
 Repetitive strain injury

References

External links 
 

Inflammations
Overuse injuries
Tennis terminology
Sports injuries
Soft tissue disorders
Tennis culture
Wikipedia medicine articles ready to translate